FNY may refer to:

Finchley Road & Frognal railway station, London, National Rail station code
French Navy, the maritime arm of the French Armed Forces (ICAO airport code)